The Hubbard Park Historic District encompasses a residential development and park west of Harvard Square in Cambridge, Massachusetts.  The area was originally the estate of Gardiner Hubbard, who had a  estate and house on nearby Brattle Street.  In the 1880s Hubbard commissioned architects to build a ring of high quality homes around his mansion, which was demolished in 1939 and is now the site of Hubbard Park.  The houses in this development are now located on Mercer Circle, Sparks Street, and Hubbard Park Road.

The district was listed on the National Register of Historic Places (NRHP) in 1982.

See also
Hubbard Park in Meriden, Connecticut, also listed on the NRHP
National Register of Historic Places listings in Cambridge, Massachusetts

References

Queen Anne architecture in Massachusetts
Colonial Revival architecture in Massachusetts
Historic districts in Middlesex County, Massachusetts
National Register of Historic Places in Cambridge, Massachusetts
Historic districts on the National Register of Historic Places in Massachusetts